Clinical Risk is a bimonthly peer-reviewed medical journal covering the field of clinical practice. The editor-in-chief is Hilary Merrett (University of Brighton). It was established in 1995 and is published by SAGE Publications.

Abstracting and indexing
The journal is abstracted and indexed in:
CINAHL
EBSCO databases
ProQuest databases
Scopus

References

External links

SAGE Publishing academic journals
English-language journals
Clinical practice journals
Bimonthly journals
Publications established in 1995